Pu Tiansheng (or Pu Tian-shen, Chinese: 蒲添生, 1912.06.19~1996.05.31) was a well-known Taiwanese sculptor. He created Taiwan's first ever likeness of Sun Yat-sen, today on display in front of Taipei Zhongshan Hall. He was a pioneer of modern sculpture in  Taiwan, founder of Taiwan's first bronze casting factory.

Early life 
Born into a family of traditional painters in 1912, Pu Tiansheng's father Pu Ying ran the Wenjin picture framing shop on Chiayi's Mei Street (renamed Chengren St. after the war). Pu Tiansheng's talents in painting were directly influenced by his childhood environment. At the age of fourteen, his glue color painting Gamecock（鬥雞）won first place at the Hsinchu Art Exhibition.

In 1929, he joined the Chun-Meng Painting Society established by his neighbor Lin Yushan and Pan Chunyuan, a painter from Tainan. Members of the Chun-Meng Painting Society group were devoted to the study of Oriental painting, and included artists such as Zhu Futing and Xu Qinglian.

Education
In 1931, Pu Tiansheng went to study abroad in Japan where he entered the Kawabata Painting School. He was admitted to the Japanese painting division of Imperial Art School (today's Musashino Art University) in the following year, and later transferred to the Sculpting division. In 1934, he left school and entered the Asakura Sculpting Studio to continue his art studies. This private school was founded by the noted sculptor Fumio Asakura. Asakura also instructed Huang Tushui when Huang was studying in the graduate school at the Tokyo School of Fine Arts. Pu Tiansheng spent eight years at the Asakura Sculpture Studio and, in 1940, his work People of the Sea（海民） was selected for the 2600th Kōki Anniversary Art Exhibition (this was the Ministry of Education Art Exhibition, but the name of the event changed for this particular year in commemoration of the anniversary of the founding of Japan's Imperial line).

Work and Public Life
In 1941, he returned to Taiwan and assisted in establishing the sculpting division of the Tai-Yang Art Exhibition. He also submitted his work 'Wife' for the exhibition. In 1945, Pu and his family moved from Chiayi to Taipei and established Taiwan's first bronze casting factory. Through his father-in-law Chen Cheng-po's introduction, he began to work on memorial images of government officials and created Taiwan's first ever likeness of Sun Yat-sen, today on display in front of Taipei Zhongshan Hall.

Pu Tiansheng also served as a juror for the Taiwan Provincial Art Exhibition and lectured on sculpting at the Provincial Education Building's Sculpting Seminar. He was a pioneer of modern sculpture in Taiwan. His famous works included: Poet（詩人）, his rendering of Lu Xun's contemplative pose; a female nude work entitled Light of Spring（春之光）, selected for 1957 Japan Fine Art Exhibition (Nitten); and, his Movement（運動系列）, inspired by the female gymnastic movements.

References

External links
 Starting Out from 23.5°N: Chen Cheng-po, Academia Sinica Digital Center (ASDC)

Taiwanese sculptors
1912 births
1996 deaths